Leo-Roubert Kruger (born ) is a South African rugby union player for the  in the Currie Cup and the  in the Rugby Challenge. His regular position is prop.

References

South African rugby union players
Living people
1997 births
Rugby union players from Cape Town
Rugby union props
Golden Lions players